Alcinoe (Ancient Greek: Ἀλκινόη Alkinóē) is the name that is attributed to three women in Greek mythology:

Alcinoe, a naiad, and one of the nymphai Lykaaides (nymphs of Mount Lykaios in Arkadia). Her parents possibly were Oceanus and Tethys. She had her fellow nymphs assist Rhea whilst she was in labour with Zeus and helped nurse the infant god.
Alcinoe, daughter of King Polybus of Corinth and Periboea. She became the wife of Amphilochus, son of Dryas. Alcinoe refused to pay the full wages to Nicandra, a weaver she had hired, and the woman prayed to Athena to avenge her. The goddess afflicted Alcinoe with a passion for Xanthus of Samos and she left her husband and children and ran away with him. Coming to her senses in the middle of the voyage, she wept bitter tears and threw herself into the sea.
Alcinoe, a daughter of Sthenelus, and a granddaughter of Perseus.

Notes

References 
 Parthenius, Love Romances translated by Sir Stephen Gaselee (1882–1943), S. Loeb Classical Library Volume 69. Cambridge, MA. Harvard University Press. 1916.  Online version at the Topos Text Project.
 Parthenius, Erotici Scriptores Graeci, Vol. 1. Rudolf Hercher. in aedibus B. G. Teubneri. Leipzig. 1858. Greek text available at the Perseus Digital Library.
 Pausanias, Description of Greece with an English Translation by W.H.S. Jones, Litt.D., and H.A. Ormerod, M.A., in 4 Volumes. Cambridge, MA, Harvard University Press; London, William Heinemann Ltd. 1918. . Online version at the Perseus Digital Library
Pausanias, Graeciae Descriptio. 3 vols. Leipzig, Teubner. 1903.  Greek text available at the Perseus Digital Library.

Naiads
Ancient Corinthians
Arcadian mythology
Corinthian mythology